The true lover's knot (Lycophotia porphyrea) is a moth of the family Noctuidae. The species was first described by Michael Denis and Ignaz Schiffermüller in 1775. It is found in the west Palearctic in a wide band through northern, central and eastern Europe and Russia (up to the Ural Mountains). In the south it is spread through northern Spain and northern Portugal, northern Italy, Macedonia, Bulgaria, and northern Greece. In Europe it is found wherever its food plants grow. It is traditionally thought of as a species typical of heathland and moorland but it can often be found in places where heather and its relatives are in garden cultivation. In the mountains it is found up to an elevation of over 2000 metres above sea level.

This is a small but attractive species, with a wingspan of 26–34 mm (individuals hatched in higher altitudes tend to be smaller than those from the lowlands). The forewings are brown, often tinged with purple and marked with a complex pattern of white markings which are supposed to recall a true lover's knot. The hindwings are grey or buff. It flies from the latter half of June to the beginning of August and is attracted to light and the flowers of its food plants.

Technical description and variation

The species has a wingspan of 26–34 mm. Its forewings are brick red; the veins white; lines dark, irregularly edged with white; stigmata edged with white and black scales; the claviform elongate, slender; the orbicular small and round; hindwing ochreous fuscous. The form marmorea Grasl. from France, has a pale blurred appearance: – concinna Esp is deep purple in colour; – while suffusa Tutt from Shetland is larger than the type and brown-red.

Biology
The larva is reddish brown or pinkish ochreous; the lines pale or white, broken up and edged with fuscous marks; spiracular line pinkish white, edged above with dark and feeds on heather and related genera (e.g. Erica). The species overwinters as a larva.

References

Chinery, Michael (1986, reprinted 1991). Collins Guide to the Insects of Britain and Western Europe.
Skinner, Bernard (1984). The Colour Identification Guide to Moths of the British Isles.

External links

Lepiforum e.V.
De Vlinderstichting 

Lycophotia
Moths described in 1775
Moths of Europe
Taxa named by Michael Denis
Taxa named by Ignaz Schiffermüller